The Karoo long-billed lark (Certhilauda subcoronata) or Karoo longbill is a species of lark in the family Alaudidae. It is found in southern Africa in its natural habitat of subtropical or tropical dry shrubland.

Taxonomy and systematics
Previously, the Karoo long-billed lark was considered by some authorities to comprise several subspecies of the Cape long-billed lark. Confusingly, the terms Damara longbill and Damaraland long-billed lark are used for both the Karoo long-billed lark and the Benguela long-billed lark.

Subspecies 
Four subspecies are recognized:

 Damara longbill, Damara long-billed lark or Damaraland long-billed lark (C. s. damarensis) - (Sharpe, 1904): Originally described as a separate species in the genus Alaemon. Found in central Namibia
 Gordonia longbill, Gordonia long-billed lark or large-billed Sabota lark (C. s. bradshawi) - (Sharpe, 1904): Originally described as a separate species in the genus Alaemon. Found in southern Namibia and north-western South Africa. Confusingly, the Sabota lark is also sometimes called the large-billed Sabota lark
 C. s. subcoronata - Smith, 1843: Found in west-central South Africa
 C. s. gilli - Roberts, 1936: Found in southern South Africa

Gallery

References

Karoo long-billed lark
Karoo long-billed lark
Taxonomy articles created by Polbot